Events from the year 1746 in Denmark.

Incumbents
 Monarch – Christian VI (until 6 August), Frederick V
 Prime minister – Johan Ludvig Holstein-Ledreborg

Events
 23 March  The County of Ledreborg is established by Johan Ludvig Holstein from the manors of Ledreborg and Skullerupholm as well as Hulegården, Kornerupgård, Breientvedgården, Bonderup (sold 1764), Næsbyholm (sold 1764) and Bavelse (sold 1764).
 6 August  Frederick V becomes King of Denmark and Norway

Births
2 July – Hardenack Otto Conrad Zinck, composer (died 1832)
3 July – Sophia Magdalena of Denmark, Queen consort of Sweden (died 1813 in Sweden)

Undated 

 Birgitte Sofie Gabel, noble and courtier (died 1769)

Deaths
 1 August – Justine Cathrine Rosenkrantz, lady-in-waiting, noble and spy (born 1659)
 6 August – Christian VI, King of Denmark (born 1699)
 13 November – Michael Fabritius, businessman (died 1697)

References

 
Years of the 18th century in Denmark
Denmark
Denmark
1740s in Denmark